"Still in Love with You" is a song written and recorded by American country music artist Travis Tritt.  It was released in November 1997 as the fifth and final single from the album The Restless Kind.  The song reached #23 on the Billboard Hot Country Singles & Tracks chart.

Chart performance

References

1998 singles
1996 songs
Travis Tritt songs
Songs written by Travis Tritt
Song recordings produced by Don Was
Warner Records Nashville singles